Kells is a village near Ballymena in County Antrim, Northern Ireland, that also encompasses the neighbouring village of Connor (Ulster-Scots: Connyer). As such it is also known as Kells and Connor in which they share a primary school, library, development association etc. It is in Mid and East Antrim District Council. Kells and Connor had a population of 2,053 people (808 households) in the 2011 Census.

An old stone bridge crosses the Kells Water, separating Kells from Connor.
There is a gate community around Kells due to past history.

A Christian settlement in Connor was established in 480 AD and a Monastery in Kells in 500 AD.

History 
There is much evidence, from written sources and archaeological material, that Connor was a sizeable, complex settlement in the Early Christian period, probably with monastic and secular elements coexisting. The church of the early monastic establishment at Connor was re-built as the cathedral of the medieval Diocese of Connor and Kells. It was destroyed in the Confederate wars of the mid seventeenth century and replaced by the present Church of St Saviour early in the nineteenth century, its foundation stone for the church being laid in 1811 and the building consecrated in 1813. During the Middle Ages, an Augustinian community was established at Kells nearby. This Augustinian Abbey survived into the early seventeenth century, but was burnt in 1641. Only one wall and some short runs of wall remain of the Abbey and these are now preserved in the grounds of Dinsmore's textile factory.

Connor was the site of a significant battle between the invading army of Edward Bruce and Richard Óg de Burgh, 2nd Earl of Ulster, on 9 September 1315. Following the defeat of the Anglo-Normans by the Scots army Connor was sacked.

Kells and Connor was the location where the 1859 Ulster revival started.

Transport 
 Kells was formerly served by the Ballymena and Larne Railway, a narrow gauge railway. Kells railway station opened on 24 August 1878, closed for passenger traffic on 31 January 1933 and finally closed altogether on 3 June 1940.

See also 
 List of villages in Northern Ireland

References 

Culture Northern ireland

Villages in County Antrim